Kopylikha is a rural locality (a village) in Slednevskoye Rural Settlement, Alexandrovsky District, Vladimir Oblast, Russia. The population was 6 as of 2010.

Geography 
Kopylikha is located 24 km north of Alexandrov (the district's administrative centre) by road. Ryuminskoye is the nearest rural locality.

References

Rural localities in Alexandrovsky District, Vladimir Oblast